Ratnayake, Rathnayake, Ratnayeke or Rathnayaka (රත්නායක) is a Sinhalese name originating from the words ratna (gem) and nayake (leader). Notable people with the name include:
Given name
Ratnayake Nissanka (Prabath Nissanka) (born 1980), a Sri Lankan cricketer

Surname
Amanda Ratnayake (born 1990), Sri Lankan businesswoman and beauty pageant titleholder 
Amara Piyaseeli Ratnayake, Sri Lankan politician, former member of parliament
Anurudha Rathnayake (born 1975), Olympic boxer
Bennett Rathnayake Sri Lankan film director 
Bimal Rathnayake, Sri Lankan politician 
C. B. Rathnayake, Sri Lankan politician, member of parliament
Damith Ratnayake, Sri Lankan cricketer
Daya Ratnayake, Sri Lankan general
Gamini Rathnayake, Sri Lankan politician 
Kiri Banda Ratnayake (1924–2004), was a Sri Lankan politician, Speaker of the Sri Lankan Parliament
Kumarasiri Rathnayake (born 1967), Sri Lankan politician
May Ratnayake (1892–1988), Sri Lankan physician
Nilantha Ratnayake (born 1968), Sri Lankan cricketer
Premil Ratnayake (1933-2013),  Sri Lankan journalist, author and diplomat.
Ravi Ratnayeke (born 1960), Sri Lankan cricketer
Rita Ratnayake (1934–2006), Sri Lankan actress 
Rumesh Ratnayake (born 1964), Sri Lankan cricketer
Thilak Kumara Rathnayake, Sri Lankan actor
Tilak Ratnayake, Sri Lankan politician 
Udara Rathnayake, Sri Lankan businessman and politician
Vasanthi Ratnayake (born 1973), Sri Lankan cricketer
Victor Rathnayake (born 1942), Sri Lankan musician

References

Sinhalese surnames